KIC 1145123 (sometimes mistakenly called Kepler 1145123), is a white hued star located in the northern constellation Cygnus, the swan. It has an apparent magnitude of 13.12, making it readily visible in large telescopes, but not to the naked eye.

Characteristics
KIC 11145123 has a simple spectral classification of A, indicating that it is an A-type star. It has 1.71 times the mass of the Sun and 1.57 times its radius. This corresponds to a period of roughly 100 days. Despite appearing as a main sequence star (Gaia DR3 models it as such), it is most likely a blue straggler.

Roundest natural object
KIC 11145123 is believed to currently be the roundest natural object, with the difference between equatorial and polar radii equaling a mere three kilometers.

References

A-type main-sequence stars
Kepler Input Catalog
Cygnus (constellation)
Blue stragglers